Giorgos Dritsas (born June 5, 2003) is a Greek professional basketball player for Palaio Faliro B.C. of the Greek B Basket League. He is a 1.82 m (5' ") tall point guard.

Early career
Dritsas started to play for Olympiacos BC Academy in 2017. He was member of the team that won the U-18 Championships in 2019 and 2021.

In August 2021 U-18 Greek Championship at Thessaloniki, he played in all 5 matches for Olympiakos BC U-18, averaging 12.4 points, 2.4 rebounds, 3.0 assists and 0.8 steals per game.

Professional career

Olympiacos B (2020-2021)
Dritsas began his pro career in 2020, during the 2020-21 season, with the Greek 2nd Division club Olympiacos' reserve team, Olympiacos B.

2020-2021: Rookie season
He made 5 appearances during the Greek A2 Basket League 2020–21 season and helped his team to win promotion to the Greek Basket League. He averaged 1.8 points, 0.2 rebounds, 0.4 assists and 0.2 steals per game.

Triton BC (2021-2022)
In September 2021 Dritsas signed contract with the Greek 2nd Division club Triton BC. He made 21 appearances during the Greek A2 Basket League 2021–22 season and averaged 2.4 points, 1.2 rebounds, 1.3 assists and 0.5 steals per game in 8.4 minutes, as Triton finished 3rd in championship.

Palaio Faliro B.C. (2022-present)
In June 2022 Dritsas signed contract with the Greek B Basket League club Palaio Faliro B.C.

References

External links
EuroLeague Under-18 Profile
EuroCup Profile
ProBallers.com Profile
DraftExpress.com Profile

Living people
2003 births
Greek men's basketball players
Point guards
Basketball players from Athens